North Tower may refer to: 

North Tower (lighthouse), a lighthouse in Schiermonnikoog, Netherlands
 North Tower (Salford), a building in Salford, England
 North Tower, 1 World Trade Center prior to its destruction on September 11, 2001
 North Tower, 30 Hudson Yards, a skyscraper in New York City

See also 
South Tower (disambiguation)